Zaafrane, Algeria is a town and commune in Djelfa Province, Algeria. 12,865 people were counted there in the 1998 census.

References

Communes of Djelfa Province